Michael F. Hughes (October 25, 1866 – April 10, 1931) was an American Major League Baseball pitcher from  to .

Although his career was short, the New York City native did have one season worth noting, his rookie season in 1888.  That season, he recorded 25 victories for the second place Brooklyn Bridegrooms.  He finished his three-season career with 39 wins, 28 losses, and a 3.22 earned run average.

Hughes died in Jersey City, New Jersey at the age of 64, and was buried in Holy Name Cemetery in Jersey City.

References

External links

1866 births
1931 deaths
19th-century baseball players
Major League Baseball pitchers
Brooklyn Bridegrooms players
Philadelphia Athletics (AA) players
Bridgeport Giants players
Jersey City Skeeters players
Newark Domestics players
Waterbury Brassmen players
Newark Little Giants players
Baseball players from New York City
Burials at Holy Name Cemetery (Jersey City, New Jersey)